Ella and Duke at the Cote D'Azur is a 1967 live album by Ella Fitzgerald, accompanied by the big band of Duke Ellington.

It was recorded live at the Jazz à Juan festival at Juan-les-Pins, on the French Riviera, between June 26 and July 29, 1966. Earlier in the year, Fitzgerald and Ellington had recorded their only other live album together, The Stockholm Concert, 1966, in Stockholm.

The album was released as a double-LP in 1967. In 1998, Verve Records released the concert on compact disc, in both a two-CD version and a complete eight-CD version.

Track listing
For the original 1967 Verve double LP release (Verve V6-4072-2), and the 1997 reissue on 2-CD set (Verve 539 030-2).
All tracks with Duke Ellington and His Orchestra, except tracks 3, 5 and 6 on disc one and tracks 3, 4 and 6, disc two. All tracks with Ella Fitzgerald are indicated.

CD 1
LP, Side One
"Mack the Knife" (Marc Blitzstein, Bertolt Brecht, Kurt Weill) – 4:52 – Ella Fitzgerald with Duke Ellington and His Orchestra
"That Old Circus Train Turn-Around Blues" (Duke Ellington) – 9:59
"Lullaby of Birdland" (George Shearing, George David Weiss) – 2:53 – Ella Fitzgerald with the Jimmy Jones Trio
LP, Side Two
"Trombonio-Bustioso-Issimo" (Cat Anderson) – 4:05
"Goin' Out of My Head" (Teddy Randazzo, Bobby Weinstein) – 3:01 – Ella Fitzgerald with the Jimmy Jones Trio
"How Long Has This Been Going On?" (George Gershwin, Ira Gershwin) – 2:50 – Ella Fitzgerald with the Jimmy Jones Trio
"Diminuendo in Blue" / "Blow by Blow" (Ellington) – 7:36

Previously unreleased bonus track issued on disc one of the 1997 reissue
"Jive Jam" (Ellington) – 8:50

CD 2
LP, Side Three
"It Don't Mean a Thing (If It Ain't Got That Swing)" (Ellington, Irving Mills) – 7:13 – Ella Fitzgerald with Duke Ellington and His Orchestra
"All Too Soon" (Ellington, Carl Sigman) – 7:39
"Misty" (Johnny Burke, Erroll Garner) – 3:04 – Ella Fitzgerald with the Jimmy Jones Trio

LP, Side Four
"Só Danço Samba" (Antonio Carlos Jobim, Vinicius de Moraes, Norman Gimbel) – 5:46 – Ella Fitzgerald with the Jimmy Jones Trio
"Rose of the Rio Grande" (Ross Gorman, Edgar Leslie, Harry Warren) – 3:09
"The More I See You" (Mack Gordon, Warren) – 3:56 – Ella Fitzgerald with the Jimmy Jones Trio
"The Matador (El Viti)" (Ellington) – 4:09
"Just Squeeze Me (But Please Don't Tease Me)" (Ellington, Lee Gaines) – 3:47 – Ella Fitzgerald with Duke Ellington and His Orchestra

Previously unreleased bonus track issued on disc two of the 1997 reissue
"The Trip" (Ellington) – 4:44
"Things Ain't What They Used to Be" (Mercer Ellington, Ted Persons) – 2:11

Eight disc full concert release

For the 1998 Verve 8CD reissue Côte d'Azur Concerts (Verve 314-539 033-2). The release comprises 110 performances, of which 88 are previously unreleased (Most part of disc eight are rehearsal takes including studio talk).

Disc One Duke Ellington and His Orchestra

"Diminuendo in Blue" / "Blow by Blow" (Duke Ellington) – 8:06
"Caravan" (Ellington, Irving Mills, Juan Tizol) – 6:06
"Rose of the Rio Grande" (Ross Gorman, Edgar Leslie, Harry Warren) – 2:51
"Tutti for Cootie" (Ellington, Jimmy Hamilton) – 6:24
"Skin Deep" (Louie Bellson) – 10:49
"Passion Flower" (Billy Strayhorn) – 4:51
"Things Ain't What They Used to Be" (Mercer Ellington, Ted Persons) – 3:02
"Wings and Things" (Johnny Hodges) – 10:27
"The Star-Crossed Lovers" (D. Ellington, Strayhorn) – 4:20
"Such Sweet Thunder" (D. Ellington, Strayhorn) – 3:24
"Madness in Great Ones" (D. Ellington, Strayhorn) – 5:23
"Kinda Dukish" / "Rockin' in Rhythm" (Harry Carney, D. Ellington, Mills) – 5:07
"Things Ain't What They Used to Be" – 2:35

Disc Two Duke Ellington and His Orchestra featuring Ella Fitzgerald on tracks 9–11.

"Main Stem" (D. Ellington) – 3:53
Medley: "Black and Tan Fantasy" / "Creole Love Call" / "The Mooche" (D. Ellington, Bubber Miley) – 8:55
"West Indian Pancake" (D. Ellington) – 4:45
"El Viti" (Gerald Wilson) – 4:01
"The Opener" (D. Ellington) – 3:01
"La Plus Belle Africane" (D. Ellington) – 11:50
"Azure" (D. Ellington, Mills) – 7:44
 Duke Ellington introduces Ella Fitzgerald – 1:05
"Let's Do It, Let's Fall in Love" (Cole Porter) – 4:08
"Satin Doll" (D. Ellington, Johnny Mercer, Strayhorn) – 3:16
"Cotton Tail" (D. Ellington) – 7:07
"Take the "A" Train" (Strayhorn) – 5:47

Disc Three Duke Ellington and His Orchestra

"Take the "A" Train" – 0:55
"Such Sweet Thunder" – 3:06
"Half the Fun" (D. Ellington, Strayhorn) – 4:24
"Madness in Great Ones" – 5:26
"The Star-Crossed Lovers" – 4:21
"I Got It Bad (and That Ain't Good)" (D. Ellington, Paul Francis Webster) – 2:18
"Things Ain't What They Used to Be" – 2:28
"Wings and Things" – 8:26
"Kinda Dukish" / "Rockin' in Rhythm" – 5:10
"Chelsea Bridge" (Strayhorn) – 4:18
"Skin Deep" – 12:12
"Sophisticated Lady" (D. Ellington, Mills, Parish) – 4:13
"Jam with Sam" (D. Ellington) – 3:19
"Things Ain't What They Used to Be" – 2:18

Disc Four Duke Ellington and His Orchestra

"Soul Call" (Bellson) – 2:41
"West Indian Pancake" – 4:37
"El Viti" – 1:19
"The Opener" – 3:08
"La Plus Belle Africane" – 13:23
"Take the "A" Train" – 4:24
"Trombonio-Bustoso-Issimo" (Cat Anderson) – 4:21
"Such Sweet Thunder" – 3:11
"Half the Fun" – 4:15
"Madness in Great Ones" – 4:15
"The Star-Crossed Lovers"  – 4:20
"Prelude to a Kiss" (D. Ellington, Strayhorn) – 4:26
"Things Ain't What They Used to Be"  – 2:27

Disc Five Duke Ellington and His Orchestra featuring Ella Fitzgerald on all tracks, except track 1.

"The Old Circus Train Turn-Around Blues" (D. Ellington) – 11:29
"Thou Swell" (Richard Rodgers, Lorenz Hart) – 1:39
"Satin Doll" – 2:42
"Wives and Lovers" (Burt Bacharach, Hal David) – 2:22
"Something to Live For" – 4:13
"Let's Do It, Let's Fall in Love" – 4:06
"The More I See You" (Mack Gordon, Warren) – 3:57
"Goin' Out of My Head" – 3:01
"So Danco Samba" (Antonio Carlos Jobim, Vinicius de Moraes, Norman Gimbel) – 5:49
"Lullaby of Birdland" (George Shearing, George David Weiss) – 2:53
"How Long Has This Been Going On?" (George Gershwin, Ira Gershwin) – 3:07
"Mack the Knife" (Kurt Weill, Bertolt Brecht, Marc Blitzstein) – 5:01

Disc Six Duke Ellington and His Orchestra featuring Ella Fitzgerald on tracks 12–16.
Medley: "Black and Tan Fantasy" / "Creole Love Call" / "The Mooche" (Duke Ellington, Bubber Miley) – 9:42
"Soul Call" – 4:33
"West Indian Pancake" – 4:43
"El Viti" – 4:09
"La Plus Belle Africane" – 12:30
"Such Sweet Thunder" – 3:12
"Half the Fun" – 4:20
"Madness in Great Ones" – 5:00
"The Star-Crossed Lovers" – 4:08
"Wings and Things" – 3:22
"Things Ain't What They Used to Be"  – 1:58
"Thou Swell" – 2:00
"Satin Doll" – 2:42
"Wives and Lovers" – 2:29
"Something to Live For" (D. Ellington, Strayhorn) – 3:23
"Let's Do It (Let's Fall in Love)" – 3:26

Disc Seven Duke Ellington and His Orchestra featuring Ella Fitzgerald on tracks 1–8.

"Sweet Georgia Brown" (Ben Bernie, Kenneth Casey, Maceo Pinkard) – 3:36
"Goin' Out of My Head" – 3:34
"So Danco Samba" – 6:07
"Lullaby of Birdland" – 3:06
"Moment of Truth" (Tex Satterwhite, Frank Scott) – 2:14
"Misty" (Erroll Garner, Johnny Burke) – 3:26
"Mack the Knife" – 5:36
"Cotton Tail" – 7:13
"The Trip" (D. Ellington) – 4:44
"Juve Jam" (D. Ellington) – 9:34
"All Too Soon" (D. Ellington, Carl Sigman) – 7:18
"The Old Circus Train Turn-Around Blues" – 7:18
"It Don't Mean a Thing (If It Ain't Got That Swing)" (D. Ellington, Mills) – 7:14
"Just Squeeze Me (But Please Don't Tease Me)" (D. Ellington, Lee Gaines) – 4:27

Disc Eight Duke Ellington and His Orchestra

"The Old Circus Train Turn-Around Blues" – 1:09
"The Old Circus Train Turn-Around Blues" – 1:31
"The Old Circus Train Turn-Around Blues" – 1:50
"The Old Circus Train Turn-Around Blues" – 1:11
"The Old Circus Train Turn-Around Blues" – 2:40
"The Old Circus Train Turn-Around Blues" – 3:38
"The Old Circus Train Turn-Around Blues" – 2:00
"Blue Fuse No. 2" (D. Ellington) – 1:39
"Blue Fuse No. 2" – 0:44
"Blue Fuse No. 1" (D. Ellington) – 0:37
"Blue Fuse No. 1" – 0:51
"Blue Fuse No. 1" – 2:57
"The Shepherd" (D. Ellington) – 2:33
"The Old Circus Train Turn-Around Blues" – 4:44
"The Old Circus Train Turn-Around Blues" – 8:07
"Tingling Is a Happiness" (D. Ellington) – 4:00

Personnel

Performance
 Ella Fitzgerald – vocals
 Jimmy Jones – piano
 Jim Hughart – bass
 Grady Tate – drums

 Duke Ellington Orchestra:
 Cat Anderson – trumpet
 Lawrence Brown – trombone
 Harry Carney – clarinet, baritone sax
 Buster Cooper – trombone, claves
 Duke Ellington – piano
 Mercer Ellington – trumpet
 Paul Gonsalves  – tenor sax
 Jimmy Hamilton – clarinet, tenor saxophone
 Johnny Hodges – alto sax
 Herbie Jones – trumpet, guiro
 John Lamb – bass
 Ray Nance – trumpet, violin, vocals
 Russell Procope – clarinet, alto saxophone
 Ben Webster – tenor saxophone
 Cootie Williams – trumpet
 Sam Woodyard – drums

Technical
 Duke Ellington – arranger
 Norman Granz – liner notes
 Jean-Pierre Leloir – photography
 Billy Strayhorn – arranger

Reissue
 Chika Azuma – art direction
 Claude Carriere – liner notes
 Deborah Hay – editorial assistant
 Chris Herles – mastering
 Tom Greenwood – production assistant
 Suha Gur – mastering
 Brian Priestley – liner notes
 Peter Pullman – liner notes, booklet editor
 Kevin Reeves – mastering
 Richard Seidel – executive producer
 Cynthia Sesso – photo research
 Robert Silverberg – production assistant
 Michael Ullman – liner notes
 Suzanne White – package design, package coordinator
 Ben Young – liner notes, supervisor

References

Duke Ellington live albums
Ella Fitzgerald live albums
Albums produced by Norman Granz
1967 live albums
Live big band albums
Verve Records live albums
Albums arranged by Billy Strayhorn
Albums arranged by Duke Ellington
Albums recorded at Jazz à Juan